The 2010 election for mayor of Chattogram City Corporation, Bangladesh was held on 10 June 2010.The result was a victory for the Bangladesh Nationalist Party candidate Mohammad Manjur Alam.

Elections

References

2010 elections in Bangladesh
2010 in Bangladesh
Local elections in Bangladesh
Elections in Chittagong